The Strada statale 131 (SS 131),  is the major road in Sardinia, Italy. It is a freeway that connects the towns of Porto Torres and Cagliari via Sassari, Macomer and Oristano. At 229 km, it  is considered the "spinal cord" of Sardinia.
It is a part of the E25 European route.

History
Building works begun in the 19th century, under the Kingdom of Charles Felix of Sardinia, the road followed the route of the ancient Roman road Turris Lybissonis-Caralis.

The infrastructure was modernized under fascism, and in the 1970s was rebuilt, becoming a Superstrada (Dual carriageway), some stretches are classified a second category extra-urban road, and the speed limit is 90 km/h, while other ones are considered first category extra-urban road with higher speed limits (110 km/h).

See also
 Strada statale 131 Diramazione Centrale Nuorese

Transport in Sardinia
131
Roads in Italy